The Fertility Transition in Iran: Revolution and Reproduction is a 2009 book by Meimanat Hosseini-Chavoshi, Peter McDonald and Mohammad Jalal Abbasi-Shavazi in which the authors examine the fertility rate changes in the Islamic Republic of Iran.
The book was awarded Iran's Book of the Year Award.

References

External links
The Fertility Transition in Iran: Revolution and Reproduction

2009 non-fiction books
Springer Science+Business Media books
Demographics of Iran
Demography books